The Beja District is located in southern Portugal. The district capital is the city of Beja. It is the largest district of the country by area, and constitutes around 11% of its area.

Municipalities
The district is composed of 14 municipalities: 
 Aljustrel
 Almodôvar
 Alvito
 Barrancos
 Beja
 Castro Verde
 Cuba
 Ferreira do Alentejo
 Mértola
 Moura
 Odemira
 Ourique
 Serpa
 Vidigueira
All 14 municipalities is divided into 75 freguesias or parishes.

Summary of votes and seats won 1976-2022

|- class="unsortable"
!rowspan=2|Parties!!%!!S!!%!!S!!%!!S!!%!!S!!%!!S!!%!!S!!%!!S!!%!!S!!%!!S!!%!!S!!%!!S!!%!!S!!%!!S!!%!!S!!%!!S!!%!!S
|- class="unsortable" align="center"
!colspan=2 | 1976
!colspan=2 | 1979
!colspan=2 | 1980
!colspan=2 | 1983
!colspan=2 | 1985
!colspan=2 | 1987
!colspan=2 | 1991
!colspan=2 | 1995
!colspan=2 | 1999
!colspan=2 | 2002
!colspan=2 | 2005
!colspan=2 | 2009
!colspan=2 | 2011
!colspan=2 | 2015
!colspan=2 | 2019
!colspan=2 | 2022
|-
| align="left"| PS || 32.0 || 2 || 22.0 || 1 || 21.1 || 1 || 28.0 || 2 || 20.1 || 1 || 20.3 || 1 || 28.4 || 1 || style="background:#FF66FF;"|45.8 || style="background:#FF66FF;"|2  || style="background:#FF66FF;"|46.7 || style="background:#FF66FF;"|2 || style="background:#FF66FF;"|43.5 || style="background:#FF66FF;"|2 || style="background:#FF66FF;"|51.0 || style="background:#FF66FF;"|2 || style="background:#FF66FF;"|34.9 || style="background:#FF66FF;"|2 || style="background:#FF66FF;"|29.8 || style="background:#FF66FF;"|1 || style="background:#FF66FF;"|37.3 || style="background:#FF66FF;"|1 || style="background:#FF66FF;"|40.7 || style="background:#FF66FF;"|2 || style="background:#FF66FF;"|43.7 || style="background:#FF66FF;"|2
|-
| align="left"| PSD || 8.2 ||  || align=center colspan=4 rowspan=2|In AD || 11.8 ||  || 13.7 || 1 || 24.5 || 1 || 29.3 || 1 || 15.7 || 1 || 14.5 ||  || 21.2 ||  || 12.3 ||  || 14.6 ||   || 23.7 || 1 || align=center colspan=2 rowspan=2|In PàF || 13.3 ||  || 15.9
|-
| align="left"| CDS-PP || 4.2 ||  || 4.1 ||  || 2.2 ||  || 2.0 ||  || 2.3 ||  || 3.6 ||  || 3.9 ||  || 3.7 ||  || 2.9 ||  || 5.7 ||   || 7.3 ||  || 2.3 ||  || 0.8 || 
|-
| align="left"| PCP/APU/CDU || style="background:red"|44.0 || style="background:red"|4 || style="background:red"|50.7 || style="background:red"|3 || style="background:red"|47.1 || style="background:red"|3 || style="background:red"|49.4 || style="background:red"|3 || style="background:red"|44.9 || style="background:red"|3 || style="background:red"|38.7 || style="background:red"|3 || style="background:red"|30.4 || style="background:red"|2 || 29.2 || 1 || 28.3 || 1 || 24.2 || 1 || 24.1 || 1 || 29.1 || 1 || 25.4 || 1 || 25.0 || 1 || 22.8 || 1 || 18.4 || 1
|-
| align="left"| AD || colspan=2| || 19.0 || 1 || 22.4 || 1 || colspan=26|
|-
| align="left"| PàF || colspan=26| || 20.1 || 1 || colspan=4|
|-
! Total seats || colspan=2| 6 || colspan=10|5 || colspan=4|4 ||colspan=16|3
|-
! colspan=33|Source: Comissão Nacional de Eleições
|}

External links
Photos from Beja (district)

 
Districts of Portugal
District